As with all older American cities, Louisville, Kentucky, has several generations of theatres, spanning from live stage theatres to large ornate downtown theatres to standalone neighborhood theatres to modern multiplexes. A great deal of the older theatres have been razed, or their buildings converted to other purposes.

"Years active" refers to years the building was actively used as a theatre. Due to renumbering and consolidation over the years, the address given may not exactly correspond to the modern building or lot at that location.

[1] The Lyric Theatre was actually at 601 W. Walnut per a 1929 advertisement.

See also
List of attractions and events in the Louisville metropolitan area
Performing arts in Louisville, Kentucky

References

Notes
Louisville Theaters on Cinema Tour

Buildings and structures in Louisville, Kentucky
Cinemas and movie theaters in Kentucky
Louisville
Louisville
Louisville, Kentucky-related lists
American film-related lists
Louisville, Kentucky
Theaters in Louisville